Bonnie Chakraborty is an Indian playback singer. he was the lead vocalist of Kolkata based band Krosswindz until 1998. He has sung many songs in several languages including Hindi, Tamil and Bengali for various films.

Career
Chakraborty teamed with Neil Mukherjee and formed a band, Kashti which was promoted by Zee Music. They produced an album of 8 songs that came and went unnoticed by the general public, although it was popular in the music circles of Mumbai. After three years the contract ended and the duo separated. Chakraborty moved on with the formation of another band, Oikyotaan along with Kartick das Baul, a baul singer from Guskara in West Bengal. He has four Bengali albums to his credit including three for the group Mohiner Ghoraguli, led by Gautam Chattopadhyay.

In 2011 he released Tagore Unbound, a Rabindra sangeet album with his wife, Usri Banerjee.

Filmography

References

External links
 Oikyotaan

Bengali singers
Living people
Indian rock singers
Singers from Kolkata
21st-century Indian singers
21st-century Indian male singers
Year of birth missing (living people)